Sheffi Paz (born July 18, 1952) is an Israeli activist against illegal immigrants and border infiltration, living in south Tel Aviv. In the past she was an activist in the Israeli political party Meretz, and since 2012 she has been one of the leaders in the movement against illegal immigration to Israel, and the concentration of these infiltrators in the old neighborhoods of south Tel Aviv.

Early life 

Paz was born in Łódź, Poland in 1952 to Holocaust survivor parents. At the age of four she made aliyah with her parents, and grew up in Holon, Israel. She participated in the youth movement Hashomer Hatzair. After the Six-Day War, when she was 15, she participated in protests in Tel Aviv supporting Israeli settlements. For her mandatory military service in the Israeli Defense Forces, she served in the Technology and Maintenance Corps.

Early Activism 

After coming out, Paz became a left-wing activist and was a member of the Meretz party for decades. She demonstrated with Peace Now in Sebastia against the settlers of Elon Moreh, against Israeli settlements, and in the summer of 2011 she participated in the Israeli social justice protests. Paz was a lesbian activist for LGBT rights, and was a member of the feminist lesbian association Klaf. She participated in protest shifts outside of the house of then-president Ezer Weizman, after he made homophobic public statements, and she stood on the side of drag queens in the Israeli Wigstock riots of 1998.

Until 1995 she lived next to Habima Theatre. In 1996 she and her partner chose to move to the Shapira neighborhood in south Tel Aviv, because of its multicultural and diverse nature. In her words, she was friendly with members of the immigrant population, particularly with two Nigerian families in her building. In 2002, during a wave of deportations ordered by Ariel Sharon, she even hid a Nigerian migrant in her house when the immigration police were spread out in the area. Later, however, her views began to change, and she became active in anti-refugee organizations.

In the municipal elections for Tel Aviv city council in 2013, Paz came in sixth place among candidates the "Southern Faction" party. The party won one seat and did not enter the city council.

Anti-Immigration Activism

The South Tel Aviv Liberation Front 

Since 2012, Paz has had a significant role in the movement against African immigration to Israel, as a member of the organization "Otef Tahana HaMerkazit". Paz led a branch of the organization, which calls itself the "South Tel Aviv Liberation Front". She attempts to vilify the asylum seeking community through video. She interviews with the media, organizes violent protests and hangs signs with the goal of convincing the Israeli public that the migrant population in south Tel Aviv causes serious problems for the native residents. She often uses violent means, including pepper-spraying a guard at an elementary school, threatening an Israeli Supreme Court justice, vandalizing the home of the Chief Justice of the Israeli Supreme Court, vandalizing the European Union office in Israel, and breaking into preschools for migrant children.

With this goal she has partnered with various right-wing Israeli organizations. She protests the refugees' use of public parks and schools. She frequently violently confronts and harasses human rights activists that advocate for refugees, claiming that they are violating the rights of the Jewish, low socio-economic class residents, who feel abandoned by the state and city governments. Although she voted for Meretz for decades, her radical views and actions, along with her confrontations with the Israeli left, have pushed her political views rightwards.

Since August 2017 Paz has led weekly demonstrations opposite the house of the former head of the Supreme Court of Israel, Miriam Naor, in Rehavia, Jerusalem, and outside the house of the current head Esther Hayut in Tzahala, north Tel Aviv. In November 2017 she was arrested during a protest that she led opposite the house of the head of the Supreme Court.

Paz has had numerous encounters with African asylum seekers in which she incites violence, and has been arrested 14 times as a result of her violent behavior. In a 2016 interview with Hilo Glazer from Haaretz newspaper, she openly admitted to siding with activists who call for "Death to the Sudanese!" She also has had a restraining order placed against her by social activist Sigal Avivi.

In October 2017 Paz created a crowdfunding campaign in order to fund activism against Israel's asylum seekers, which raised about 500 thousand shekels.

Indictments 

In September 2019, Paz and bereaved mother Meirav Hajaj illegally vandalised the entrance of office of the European Union delegation in Israel. They spray-painted slogans in red paint which read: “EU get out” and “German money kill Jews”. In January 2020, Paz and her co-conspirators were charged with conspiring to commit a crime, intentionally causing property damage and vandalism.

In December 2020, Paz was also indicted for breaking into a preschool for migrant children and endangering children. The offences cited in the indictment include destruction of property, obstructing an investigation, criminal conspiracy, breaking and entering and invasion of privacy. In preparation for this break-in, Paz and her fellow anti-immigration activists wrote to one-another blatantly racist messages including “thumbtacks should be scattered in the preschools and not the roads so as not to injure the white residents.” Paz also planned for future graffiti, of which she said: “What’s important is that it be offensive toward the children.”

References 

Israeli lesbians
Living people
1952 births
Hashomer Hatzair members
Israeli Ashkenazi Jews
Israeli feminists
Israeli people of Polish-Jewish descent
Israeli political activists
Lesbian Jews
Israeli LGBT rights activists
Peace Now people
Polish emigrants to Israel
Tel Aviv University alumni
Jewish women activists
Anti-immigration activists
People from Łódź
People from Holon
20th-century Israeli LGBT people
21st-century Israeli LGBT people